Speed skating at the 2014 Winter Olympics was held at the Adler Arena, Sochi, Russia, between 8 and 22 February 2014.

Competition schedule
The following is the competition schedule for all twelve events. With the exception of the Team pursuit events, all rounds of each event were concluded within a single session.

All times are (UTC+4).

Medal summary
Netherlands dominated in speed skating, winning a total of 23 medals including eight out of the twelve gold medals and medals in all events. There were four Dutch podium sweeps where the Netherlands won the gold, silver and bronze medal, making the Netherlands the first country in Olympic speed skating history to achieve this. The events were the: Men's 5000m, Men's 500m, Women's 1500m and Men's 10,000m. In the women's 1,500 metres, Dutch athletes placed 1st, 2nd, 3rd and 4th; the first such result in Olympic speed skating history by athletes from a single nation.

On 24 November 2017 the silver medal of Olga Fatkulina was disqualified as part of the Russian team doping case. On 1 February 2018, Olga Fatkulina successfully appealed against IOC decision at the Court of Arbitration for Sport. As a result, her silver medal was reinstated.

(WR = World Record, OR = Olympic Record)

Medal table

Men's events

Women's events

 On 24 November 2017, silver medalist from Russia Olga Fatkulina was disqualified for a doping violation. On 1 February 2018, her results were restored as a result of the successful appeal.

Olympic records broken

Other records 
A total of four podium sweeps were recorded in speed skating, where one nation won the gold, silver and bronze medals in a single event. This was the highest number of podium sweeps to have occurred in speed skating in Olympic history. Every one of these four podium sweeps was won by the Netherlands team.

Qualification

Each NOC was allowed to delegate a maximal number of ten men and ten women speed skaters who reached the qualification criteria. A proposal of the Dutch skating association (KNSB) to add an extra athlete, especially for the team pursuit event, was rejected at the congress of the international federation ISU in Kuala Lumpur in June 2012.

Qualification times
The qualification times were released in July 2013. The women's times stayed the same from Vancouver except for a more stringent standard in the 3000 m, while the men's qualification times have all slightly decreased.

Participating nations
A total of 181 athletes from 23 nations participated (the numbers of athletes are shown in parentheses). Chinese Taipei made its debut in the sport.

References

External links
Official Results Book – Speed Skating

 
2014
Speed skating
Winter Olympics
Winter Olympics,2014